Central Forest Reserve National Park is the second national park to be designated in the Federation of Saint Christopher and Nevis. It was designated a National Park by the government on 23 October 2006, and officially gazetted on 29 March 2007.

While the Central Forest Reserve is the second National Park in St. Kitts and Nevis, it is the first designated for the purposes of biodiversity conservation and sustainable development. The park contains the last remaining area of tropical forest on the island of Saint Kitts, which collects and stores rainfall for the national water supply of the island.

Many plants such as tree ferns including Asplenium malcolm-smithii, and the Cabbage palm (Roystonea oleracea), birds such as the Lesser Antillean pewee (Contopus latirostris), bats such as the Long-tongued fruit bat or the Little big-eyed bat (Chiroderma trinitatum), and vegetation communities such as cloud forests are primarily exclusive to the high slopes of the island.

The topography of the Central Forest Reserve consists of steep narrow valleys or ghauts, rocky outcrops and cliffs, swamps, alpine marshes and bogs, landslips and other geological scars, streams, lakes, reservoirs, small upland pools, fumaroles, forests, woodlands, and grasslands.

References 

Parks in Saint Kitts and Nevis
National parks of Saint Kitts and Nevis
Tourist attractions in Saint Kitts and Nevis
IUCN Category II
Saint Kitts (island)
Protected areas established in 2006